Adelbert Ames (October 31, 1835 – April 13, 1933) was an American sailor, soldier, and politician who served with distinction as a Union Army general during the American Civil War. A Radical Republican, he was military governor, U.S. Senator, and civilian governor in Reconstruction-era Mississippi. In 1898, he served as a United States Army general during the Spanish–American War. He was the last Republican to serve as the state governor of Mississippi until the election of Kirk Fordice, who took office in January 1992, 116 years after Ames vacated the office.

Ames was the penultimate general officer of the Civil War to die. He succumbed at the age of 97 in 1933. He was outlived in this respect only by Aaron Daggett, who died in 1938 at the age of 100. However, because Daggett was a brevet rank brigadier general of volunteers, Ames was the last surviving Civil War general who had held his rank in the regular U.S. or Confederate States army and was also the last surviving general of the conflict who had begun his career in the regular U.S. Army.

Early life and career

Adelbert Ames was born in 1835 in the town of Rockland (then known as East Thomaston), located in Knox County, Maine. He was the younger of two sons of Martha Bradbury Ames and Jesse Ames, a sea captain who later purchased what became the Ames Mill (renowned as the producers of Malt-O-Meal) in Northfield, Minnesota.  Adelbert Ames also grew up to be a sailor and became a mate on a clipper ship, and he also served briefly as a merchant seaman on his father's ship.

On July 1, 1856, he entered the United States Military Academy at West Point, New York; he graduated five years later in May 1861, fifth in his class of forty-five. Two classes had graduated that year due to the beginning of the Civil War in April. Ames' class had graduated about a month earlier than usual, while a second class, set to graduate in 1862, graduated on June 24, 1861.

American Civil War
Ames was then commissioned a second lieutenant in the 2nd U.S. Artillery. Eight days later, he was promoted to first lieutenant and was assigned to the 5th U.S. Artillery. During the Battle of First Bull Run that July, Ames was seriously wounded in the right thigh but refused to leave his guns. He was brevetted to the rank of major on July 21 for his actions at Manassas. In 1893, Ames received the Medal of Honor for his performance there.

Returning to duty the following spring, Ames was part of the defenses of Washington, D.C. He then fought in the Peninsula Campaign and saw action at the Battle of Yorktown from April 5 to May 4, the Battle of Gaines' Mill on June 27, and the Battle of Malvern Hill that July. Ames was commended for his conduct at Malvern Hill by Col. Henry J. Hunt, chief of the artillery of the Army of the Potomac, and he received a brevet promotion to lieutenant colonel on July 1.

Although Ames was becoming an excellent artillery officer, he realized that significant promotions would be available only in the infantry. He returned to Maine and politicked to receive a commission as a regimental infantry commander and was assigned to command the 20th Maine Volunteer Infantry Regiment on August 20, 1862. The 20th Maine fought in the Maryland Campaign but saw little action at the Battle of Antietam on September 17 while in a reserve capacity. During the Union defeat at the Battle of Fredericksburg that winter, Ames led his regiment in one of the last charges on December 13 against Marye's Heights. During the Chancellorsville Campaign in May 1863, Ames volunteered as an aide-de-camp to Maj. Gen. George G. Meade, commander of the V Corps.

Probably as a result of this staff duty and his proximity to the influential Meade, Ames was promoted to brigadier general in the Union Army on May 20, 1863, two weeks following the Battle of Chancellorsville. Ames assumed brigade command in the XI Corps of the Army of the Potomac, relinquishing his command of the 20th Maine to Lt. Col. Joshua L. Chamberlain, who would soon lead the regiment to fame in the Battle of Gettysburg that July.

While his experience at Gettysburg did not achieve the renown of Chamberlain's, Ames performed well under challenging circumstances. During the massive assault by Confederate Lt. Gen. Richard S. Ewell on July 1, 1863, Ames's division commander, Brig. Gen. Francis C. Barlow, moved his division well in front of other elements of the XI Corps to a slight rise, now known as Barlow's Knoll. This salient position was quickly overrun, and Barlow was wounded and captured. Ames took command of the division and led it in retreat through the streets of Gettysburg to a position on Cemetery Hill. On July 2, the second day of battle, Ames's battered division bore the brunt of the assault on East Cemetery Hill by Maj. Gen. Jubal A. Early, but was able to hold the critical position with help from surrounding units. At one point, Ames himself took part in the hand-to-hand fighting. After the battle, the men of the 20th Maine presented Ames with their battle flag as a token of their esteem.

After the battle, Ames reverted to brigade command with a brevet promotion to colonel in the regular army. His division, under the command of Brig. Gen. George H. Gordon, was transferred to the Department of the South, where it served in actions in South Carolina and Florida.

In 1864, Ames's division, now part of the X Corps of the Army of the James, served under Maj. Gen. Benjamin Franklin Butler in the Bermuda Hundred Campaign and the Siege of Petersburg. In the future, he would become Butler's son-in-law. That winter, the division was reassigned to the XXIV Corps and sent to North Carolina.

During the two years following his service in the Army of the Potomac, Ames shifted between brigade and division command (and even led his corps on two occasions). However, he generally can be identified as a division commander. He led the successful assault in the Second Battle of Fort Fisher (commanding the 2nd Division, XXIV Corps), accompanying his men into the formidable coastal fortress as most of his staff were shot down by Confederate snipers. He received a brevet promotion to major general in the Union Army (and brigadier general in the Regular Army) on March 13, 1865, for his role in the battle.

Mississippi politics
In 1868, Congress appointed Ames as provisional governor of Mississippi. His command soon extended to the Fourth Military District, which consisted of Mississippi and Arkansas. During his administration, he took several steps to advance the rights of formerly enslaved people, appointing the first black officeholders in state history. White supremacist terrorism and violence were prevalent in the state, one of the last to comply with Reconstruction, but a general election was held during his tenure in 1869. The legislature convened at the beginning of the following year.

Around 1868, Ames became an original companion of the Military Order of the Loyal Legion of the United States, a military society of former Union officers and their descendants.

U.S. senator
The Mississippi Legislature elected Ames to the US Senate after the readmission of Mississippi to the Union. He served from February 24, 1870, to January 10, 1874, as a Republican. In Washington, Ames met and married on July 21, 1870, Blanche Butler, daughter of his former commander, then US Representative Benjamin Butler, later a one-term governor of Massachusetts. The couple had six children, including Blanche Ames Ames (the suffragist and cartoonist), Adelbert Ames Jr., and Butler Ames. As a senator, Ames became a talented public speaker to the point where even some of his Democratic opponents acknowledged his ability.

In the US Senate, Ames was chairman of the Senate Committee on Enrolled Bills. Upon being elected governor of Mississippi, he resigned his seat to assume his duties.

Governor
Ames battled James Lusk Alcorn, a former Confederate general, for control of the Republican Party, which then had mostly black voters. White Southerners who sided with the Republican Party were derisively referred to as "scalawags," small, useless horses. Southern Democrats painted so-called scalawags and carpetbaggers as traitors exploiting the Southern United States and trying to set up "Negro rule". In truth, Republican promises to rebuild the Southern United States, restore prosperity, create public schools, and expand railroads attracted some white Southerners. The Ames-Alcorn struggle reflected deep fissures in the party. In 1873, both sought a decision by running for governor. The Radicals and most black voters supported Ames, and Alcorn won the votes of scalawags, moderate Whiggish whites. Ames won by a vote of 69,870 to 50,490.

As governor, Ames fought to cut spending and lower the tax rate with moderate success. The state rate of 14 1/2 mills in 1874 was reduced to 9 1/2 in 1875 and 6 1/2 in 1876.

Even his enemies agreed that the governor had rigorous integrity and was incorruptible and sincere. His appointments included some so-called scalawags and a few former Confederates, but he was never happy in Mississippi, and much of the time, his wife and family remained in the North, where the weather was cooler and the socioeconomic conditions were less unpleasant. Ames was proud of his record and considered himself one of the best Republican governors of any of the Reconstructed states. This opinion has been generally shared by historians ever since. However, he had little success in winning over his enemies in the party and was quick to attribute sinister motives on their part.

His real problems came from the Democratic efforts to undo Reconstruction and gain control. Democrats in Vicksburg launched a coup in December 1874. When the sheriff called on his supporters to restore him to office, a battle ended in the Vicksburg Massacre. Ames had no forces to send and depended on the federal government for troops to reinstate the ousted officials. In the following months, he failed to mobilize a state militia to cope with renewed troubles. By August, the Democratic Party had united to carry the legislative elections that fall and carried out what came to be called the "Mississippi Plan." A riot in Yazoo county drove out the Republican sheriff and resulted in some blacks and party officers being lynched. The Clinton Riot on September 4 ended with white Democratic paramilitaries riding over the county, shooting every black person they chanced upon. With no other means of protection, Ames appealed to the federal government for assistance. It was not refused, but authorities urged him to exhaust state resources first.

Ames, unable to organize a state militia in time, signed a peace treaty with Democratic leaders. In return for disarming the few militia units he had assembled, they promised to guarantee a full, free, fair election, which they did not keep.

That November, Democrats terrorized a large part of the Republican vote into staying home, driving voters from the polls with shotguns and cannons, and gaining firm control of both houses of the legislature. The state legislature, convening in 1876, drew up articles of impeachment against him; with a five-to-one majority and deeply hostile feelings towards Ames, their investigations "failed to trace a dollar of unearned money to his pockets," one reporter noted. "Whatever Ames may be, he is not dishonest." Though insiders agreed that their case was a very weak one, removal was certain, particularly after his black lieutenant-governor had been removed and the line of succession led to a Democrat. Rather than face an impeachment trial that would entail great expense, Ames's lawyers made a deal: once the legislature had dropped all charges, he would resign his office, which occurred on March 29, 1876.

Later life
After leaving office, Ames settled briefly in Northfield, Minnesota, where he joined his father and brother in their flour-milling business. During his residence there, in September 1876, Jesse James and his gang of former Confederate guerrillas raided the town's bank, primarily because of Ames's (and controversial Maj. Gen. Benjamin Butler's) investment in it, but their attempt to rob it ended in catastrophic failure. Ames next headed to New York City, then later settled in Tewksbury, Massachusetts as an executive in a flour mill, along with other business interests in the nearby city of Lowell.

In 1898, he was appointed brigadier general of volunteers in the Spanish–American War and fought in Cuba. During the Battle of San Juan Hill the 3rd Brigade of the 1st Division suffered particularly high casualties with its brigade commander killed and the next two ranking regimental commanders wounded. General Ames was assigned to command the brigade during the Siege of Santiago. He commanded the 1st Division when the V Corps was mustered out in New York.

Several years afterward, he retired from business pursuits in Lowell but continued in real estate and entertainment projects in Atlantic City, New Jersey, and Florida. Ames corresponded extensively with the historian James Wilford Garner during this period; Garner's dissertation viewed Reconstruction as "unwise" but absolved Ames of personal corruption. Ames's widow compiled a collection of her correspondence with Ames, Chronicles from the Nineteenth Century, published posthumously in 1957.

About 1900, Ames joined the Massachusetts Society of Colonial Wars.

Ames died in 1933 at 97, at his winter home in Ormond Beach, Florida. At the time of his death, Ames was the last surviving full-rank general who had served in the Civil War. (The last Union general officer, Aaron S. Daggett, lived five years longer than Ames, but he had been a brevet brigadier general of U.S. Volunteers in March 1865, while Ames had been promoted to the permanent rank of brigadier general in the Regular Army about the same period.)

Ames is buried in the Hildreth family cemetery — the family of his mother-in-law, Sarah Hildreth Butler — behind the main cemetery (also known as Hildreth Cemetery) on Hildreth Street in Lowell, Massachusetts. Buried with him are his wife, Blanche Butler Ames, their six children, and the spouses of his son Butler and his daughter Edith.

Notable descendants
Ames was the son-in-law of Civil War General Benjamin Butler.

His daughter Blanche Ames Ames (she married into another Ames family) was a noted suffragist, inventor, artist, and writer. The mansion she designed and built is now part of Borderland State Park in Massachusetts.

His son Adelbert Ames Jr. was a noted scientist and inventor of the Ames Room and the Ames Window

His son Butler Ames was a businessman and politician, representing Massachusetts in Congress for ten years.

Adelbert Ames was also the great-grandfather of George Plimpton. John F. Kennedy, through George Plimpton, is indirectly responsible for a full-length biography of General Ames. In Profiles in Courage, Kennedy relied on Reconstruction-era historical texts to produce a brief but misleading, false, and devastating portrait of Ames's administration of Mississippi in his profile of Mississippi Senator Lucius Q. C. Lamar. Ames's daughter Blanche Ames Ames, a formidable figure in Massachusetts, bombarded the then-senator with letters complaining about the depiction and continued her barrage after Kennedy entered the White House. President Kennedy then turned to his friend Plimpton to tell Blanche, Plimpton's grandmother, that she was "interfering with state business." Her response was to write a book about her father, Adelbert Ames, in 1964.

In memoriam

A Medal of Honor plaque for Ames's gravesite was dedicated at a ceremony honoring Benjamin Butler's 191st birthday, held at the Hildreth family cemetery—the only time of the year it is open to the public—on November 1, 2009.

The United Spanish War Veterans established Camp 19, General Adelbert Ames Post, in Lowell, Massachusetts.

Ames Hill Castle
After settling in Massachusetts, Ames built a seventeen-room estate in Tewksbury known locally as "the Castle" on Prospect Hill, now called Ames Hill, in 1906. In 1986, the Ames Hill Castle was purchased by local developer John D. Sullivan; Sullivan then illegally converted the house into a multi-unit rental property. However, Sullivan has been subject to several court rulings for zoning violations on the property, including one in 1991 and again in 1999. In August 2010, Sullivan's attorney brought forth a proposal to Tewksbury's board of selectmen for modifications to the Ames Hill Castle, to fall under the Massachusetts Comprehensive Permit Act: Chapter 40B, which would allow him to maintain the property as a multi-unit rental legally. The board elected unanimously to table the proposal, citing several concerns – both with Sullivan's absence (as he had sent his attorney rather than present the proposal in person) and reluctance to meet with residents, and his previous legal issues with the property.

In March 2012, the Ames Hill Castle was unanimously voted "preferably preserved" by the Tewksbury Historic Commission due to its unique architectural features, the current state of preservation, and its association with General Ames. This allowed the commission to invoke a nine-month delay in possible demolition of the property to pursue alternatives. In November, local developer Marc Ginsburg purchased the Castle and surrounding plot from Sullivan for $360,000, just as the delay expired. Ginsburg ultimately decided on the Castle's demolition to make way for smaller single-family dwellings.

Popular culture
Ames was portrayed by actor Matt Letscher in the 2003 film Gods and Generals.

Dates of rank

Medal of Honor citation
Rank and Organization: First Lieutenant, 5th U.S. Artillery. Place and Date: At Bull Run, Va., July 21, 1861. Entered Service At: Rockland, Maine. Birth: East Thomaston, Maine. Date of Issue: June 22, 1894.

Citation:

Remained upon the field in command of a section of Griffin's Battery, directing its fire after being severely wounded and refusing to leave the field until too weak to sit upon the caisson where he had been placed by men of his command.

See also

 List of American Civil War Medal of Honor recipients: A–F
 List of American Civil War generals (Union)

References

References

 Ames, Blanche. Adelbert Ames, 1835–1933. New York: Argosy-Antiquarian, 1964. .
 Budiansky, Stephen. The Bloody Shirt: Terror After Appomattox. New York: Viking, 2008. .
 Current, Richard Nelson. Those Terrible Carpetbaggers: A Reinterpretation. New York: Oxford University Press, 1988. .
 Eicher, John H., and David J. Eicher. Civil War High Commands. Stanford, CA: Stanford University Press, 2001. .
 Ellem, Warren A. "The Overthrow of Reconstruction in Mississippi." Journal of Mississippi History 1992 54(2): 175-201.
 Garner, James Wilford. Reconstruction in Mississippi. Baton Rouge: Louisiana State University Press, 1968. First published in 1901.
 Harris, William C. The Day of the Carpetbagger: Republican Reconstruction in Mississippi. Baton Rouge: Louisiana State University Press, 1969. .
 Harris, William C. Presidential Reconstruction in Mississippi. Baton Rouge: Louisiana State University Press, 1967. .
 Lemann, Nicholas. Redemption: The Last Battle of the Civil War. New York: Farrar, Straus & Giroux, 2006. .
 Lord, Stuart B. "Adelbert Ames, Soldier and Politician: a Reevaluation." Maine Historical Society Quarterly 13(2) (1973): 81–97.
 Quigley, Robert D. Civil War Spoken Here: A Dictionary of Mispronounced People, Places and Things of the 1860s. Collingswood, NJ: C. W. Historicals, 1993. .
 
 Stiles, T. J. Jesse James: Last Rebel of the Civil War. New York: Alfred A. Knopf, 2002. .
 
 Warner, Ezra J. Generals in Blue: Lives of the Union Commanders. Baton Rouge: Louisiana State University Press, 1964. .

Further reading
 Benson, Harry King. "The Public Career of Adelbert Ames, 1861–1876." PhD U. Of Virginia. Dissertation Abstracts International; 1976 36(7): 4705-A, 342 pp.
 Wainwright, Charles S. A Diary of Battle: The Personal Journals of Colonel Charles S. Wainwright. Edited by Allan Nevins. New York: Da Capo Press, 1998. First published 1962 by Harcourt.

Additional Information
 Ames Family papers, 1835-1933, Sophia Smith Collection of Women's History, Smith College.

External links

  Retrieved on February 15, 2008
 
 
 
 
 
 

1835 births
1933 deaths
Butler–Ames family
People from Rockland, Maine
Union Army generals
United States Army Medal of Honor recipients
Republican Party governors of Mississippi
American military personnel of the Spanish–American War
United States Military Academy alumni
People of Maine in the American Civil War
People from Ormond Beach, Florida
19th-century American Episcopalians
Politicians from Lowell, Massachusetts
Republican Party United States senators from Mississippi
American Civil War recipients of the Medal of Honor
People from Tewksbury, Massachusetts
Radical Republicans
Impeached governors